The 1963 Tour de Romandie was the 17th edition of the Tour de Romandie cycle race and was held from 9 May to 12 May 1963. The race started and finished in Geneva. The race was won by Willy Bocklant.

General classification

References

1963
Tour de Romandie